Sapecho is a small town in Bolivia.  As of 2008, it had a population of 935.  Agriculturally, the town produces cocoa beans.

References

Populated places in La Paz Department (Bolivia)